Tatie Danielle (Auntie Danielle) is a 1990 French black comedy film directed by Étienne Chatiliez. It features Tsilla Chelton as Auntie Danielle Billard.

Tagline 

"Vous ne la connaissez pas encore, mais elle vous déteste déjà." ("You may not know her yet, but she hates you already.)

Synopsis 

Danielle Billard, aged 82, is a childless widow of an army colonel.  She lives in a small-town home in Auxerre with her faithful housekeeper, Odile. Things are not as they appear. Danielle is mean, cruel and malicious.  When Odile "accidentally" dies, Danielle divides her estate between her grand-niece and grand-nephew, Jeanne and Jean-Pierre. She then goes to live in Paris with Jean-Pierre and his family.  Although the family believes her to be an agreeable elderly lady, they soon discover her true colours.

The family goes on an extended vacation leaving their aunt in the care of a young woman, Sandrine. Little does Danielle know, she has finally met her match. Through many turbulent episodes these two women develop an ostensibly mutual love-hate "respect".

Cast 
 Tsilla Chelton as Auntie Danielle Billard
 Catherine Jacob as Catherine Billard
 Isabelle Nanty as Sandrine Vonnier
 Neige Dolsky as Odile Dombasle
 Éric Prat as Jean-Pierre Billard
 Karin Viard as Agathe
 Laurence Février as Jeanne Billard
 Mathieu Foulon as Jean-Marie Billard
 Gary Ledoux as Jean-Christophe "Totoff" 
 Virginie Pradal as Mrs. Lafosse
 Jacqueline Dufranne as Mrs. Ladurie
 Dominique MacAvoy as Mrs. Lemoine
 Bradley Harryman as Michael
 Madeleine Cheminat as Mrs. Mauprivet
 Nicole Chollet as Ginette Mauprivet
 André Wilms as Dr. Wilms
 Olivier Saladin as the butcher
 Lorella Cravotta as the butcher's wife
 Patrick Bouchitey as the beggar
 Évelyne Didi as the lady on the bus
 Frédéric Rossif as the man by the lake
 Jean-Pierre Miquel as the doctor

Awards and nominations
Tatie Danielle was nominated for three César Awards:
 1991 César Award for Best Actress nomination: Tsilla Chelton
 1991 César Award for Best Supporting Actress nomination: Catherine Jacob
 1991 César Award for Most Promising Actress nomination: Isabelle Nanty

References

External links 

1990s black comedy films
1990 drama films
1990 films
Films about old age
Films directed by Étienne Chatiliez
1990s French-language films
French black comedy films
French drama films
1990s French films